Tomaš is a surname. Notable people with the surname include:

 Stjepan Tomaš ( 1411–1461), penultimate King of Bosnia, from 1443 until his death
 Ivo-Valentino Tomaš, (1993–2019), Croatian footballer

Surnames from given names